Mama Too Tight is an album by Archie Shepp released on Impulse! Records in 1967. The album contains tracks recorded by Shepp, trumpeter Tommy Turrentine, trombonists Grachan Moncur III and Roswell Rudd, tuba player Howard Johnson, clarinetist Perry Robinson, bassist Charlie Haden and drummer Beaver Harris in August of 1966.

Reception
The AllMusic review by Thom Jurek states: "Shepp had hit his stride here compositionally... lots of free blowing, angry bursts of energy, and shouts of pure revelry are balanced with Ellingtonian elegance and restraint that was considerable enough to let the lyric line float through and encourage more improvisation. This is Shepp at his level best."

Track listing 
Side 1
1. A Portrait Of Robert Thompson (as a young man)
Introducing
a) Prelude to a Kiss (Duke Ellington, Irving Gordon, Irving Mills)
b) The Break Strain-King Cotton (public domain)
c) Dem Basses (public domain) - 18:57
Side 2
1. Mama Too Tight - 5:25
2. Theme for Ernie (Fred Lacey) - 3:21
3. Basheer - 10:38
All compositions by Archie Shepp except as indicated
 Recorded at Van Gelder Studio, Englewood Cliffs, NJ, August 19, 1966

Personnel 
 Archie Shepp: tenor saxophone
 Tommy Turrentine: trumpet
 Grachan Moncur III: trombone
 Roswell Rudd: trombone
 Howard Johnson: tuba
 Perry Robinson: clarinet
 Charlie Haden: bass
 Beaver Harris: drums

References 

Archie Shepp albums
Impulse! Records albums
albums produced by Bob Thiele
Albums recorded at Van Gelder Studio